Al Capone (1899–1947) was an American gangster during the 1920s and 1930s.

Capone may also refer to:
 Capone (surname), a surname
 Capone (1975 film)
 Capone (2020 film)
 Capone (footballer) (born 1972), a Brazilian footballer
 Capone (rapper) (born 1976), a member of the rap duo Capone-N-Noreaga

See also
 Caponians, a fictional alien race from Zak McKracken and the Alien Mindbenders
 K.Pone.Inc, record label
 Kpone, Kpone Katamanso District, Ghana